Jack Curtis may refer to:

Jack Curtis (actor) (1880–1956), silent film actor
Jack Curtis (voice actor) (1926–1970), voice actor
Jack Curtis (baseball) (born 1937), Major League Baseball player
Jack Curtis (footballer, born 1888) (1888–1955), English footballer
Jack Curtis (footballer, born 1995), English footballer
Jack Curtis (politician) (1912–2002), American politician, Missouri senator
Jack Curtis (World War II aviator) (1923–2009), World War II aviator and prisoner of war
Jack Curtis, pseudonym used by David Harsent
Jack Curtiss, pseudonym used by Jack Kirby

See also
John Curtis (disambiguation)
Jack Curtis Dubowsky, American composer